Aldin Gurdijeljac (born 7 January 1978) is a Serbian retired football defender.

Club career
Born in Novi Pazar, he played with FK Novi Pazar, OFK Beograd and FK Metalac Kraljevo in Serbia, as well as with KF Shkumbini in Albanian Superliga.

References

1978 births
Living people
Sportspeople from Novi Pazar
Bosniaks of Serbia
Association football defenders
Bosnia and Herzegovina footballers
FK Novi Pazar players
OFK Beograd players
KS Shkumbini Peqin players
Second League of Serbia and Montenegro players
First League of Serbia and Montenegro players
Kategoria Superiore players
Bosnia and Herzegovina expatriate footballers
Expatriate footballers in Albania
Bosnia and Herzegovina expatriate sportspeople in Albania